Moussa Sanoh (born 20 July 1995) is a professional footballer who plays as a winger for Eerste Divisie club Eindhoven. Born in the Ivory Coast to Liberian and Guinean parents, and raised in the Netherlands, Sanoh represents the Liberia national team.

Club career

Jong PSV
Sanoh joined PSV in 2009, and made his Jong PSV debut in March 2014, in their 2–1 away victory against FC Eindhoven, replacing Aleksandar Boljević in the 90th minute. On 2 December 2014, Sanoh scored his first goal for Jong PSV in their 3–1 home win against De Graafschap, sealing the hosts' victory in the 93rd minute.

RKC Waalwijk
In order to find first-team football, Sanoh joined fellow Eerste Divisie side RKC Waalwijk in January 2016 on a six-month deal. Three days later, Sanoh made his RKC Waalwijk debut in their 3–1 defeat against Almere City, featuring for the entire 90 minutes. Following an impressive first few months at the club, Sanoh signed a new one-year deal prior to the 2016–17 campaign. He went onto score his first goal for RKC in their 3–1 away victory over Jong Utrecht, netting in the 71st minute after replacing Fred Benson. Sanoh went onto net four more times before leaving the Dutch side in June 2017.

Crawley Town
On 5 June 2017, Sanoh agreed to join English side Crawley Town on a two-year deal with the option of an extra year. On 8 August 2017, Sanoh made his Crawley debut during their EFL Cup first round 5–1 defeat against Championship side Birmingham City. A month later, he made his league debut in their 1–0 home defeat against Notts County, replacing Dannie Bulman in the 68th minute. Sanoh scored his first goal for Crawley in their 3–1 away defeat against Portsmouth in an EFL Trophy group stage tie. On 3 July 2018, it was announced that Sanoh would leave Crawley, following a mutual termination in his contract.

Later years
On 5 July 2018, following his release from Crawley, Sanoh joined Romanian side Politehnica Iași on a two-year deal.

On 1 July 2019, Sanoh joined Romanian club Gaz Metan Mediaș.

On 12 January 2020, Sanoh joined Liga I club Voluntari on loan until the end of the 2019–20 season. His contract with Gaz Metan Mediaș was terminated at the end of December 2020.

In January 2021, Sanoh continued his career with Balzan of the Maltese Premier League.

On 10 August 2021, Sanoh signed a one-year contract with newly promoted Romanian Liga I club Mioveni, with an option for an additional year.

Sanoh returned to the Netherlands on 24 June 2022, signing a one-year contract with Eindhoven with an option for an additional year.

International career
Sanoh was born in Gbapleu, Ivory Coast, and raised in Nijmegen, Netherlands, by a father of Liberian descent and a mother of Guinean descent. Once eligible to represent Ivory Coast, Liberia, or Guinea at international level, he featured for the Netherlands under-17 and under-19 sides between 2013 and 2014 before switching to represent Liberia at senior level.

On 2 October 2021, he accepted a call-up from Liberia for two World Cup qualifiers against Cape Verde. He made his senior debut for Liberia in a 2–1 2022 FIFA World Cup qualification loss to Cape Verde on 7 October 2021.

Career statistics

References

External links

1995 births
Living people
People with acquired Liberian citizenship
Liberian footballers
Association football wingers
Crawley Town F.C. players
FC Politehnica Iași (2010) players
CS Gaz Metan Mediaș players
FC Voluntari players
Balzan F.C. players
CS Mioveni players
FC Eindhoven players
English Football League players
Liga I players
Maltese Premier League players
Liberia international footballers
Liberian expatriate footballers
Liberian expatriate sportspeople in England
Expatriate footballers in England
Liberian expatriate sportspeople in Romania
Expatriate footballers in Romania
Liberian expatriates in Malta
Expatriate footballers in Malta
Liberian people of Guinean descent
People from Montagnes District
Ivorian footballers
Ivorian expatriate footballers
Ivorian expatriate sportspeople in England
Ivorian expatriate sportspeople in Romania
Ivorian expatriate sportspeople in Malta
Ivorian people of Liberian descent
Sportspeople of Liberian descent
Ivorian people of Guinean descent
Ivorian emigrants to the Netherlands
Naturalised citizens of the Netherlands
Dutch footballers
Quick 1888 players
Jong PSV players
RKC Waalwijk players
Eerste Divisie players
Netherlands youth international footballers
Dutch expatriate footballers
Dutch expatriate sportspeople in England
Dutch expatriate sportspeople in Romania
Dutch expatriate sportspeople in Malta
Dutch people of Liberian descent
Dutch people of Guinean descent